The  Genty Akylone is a sports car developed by the French automobile manufacturer Genty Automobile. The vehicle, limited to 15 coupés and 10 roadsters, has been built in Saint-Pourçain-sur-Sioule since 2017; development started in 2011.

In video games 
 The car appeared in Asphalt 9: Legends as a high-end Class A car and in Asphalt 8: Airborne as a high-end Class B car.

References

Cars of France
Cars introduced in 2017
Coupés
Hybrid electric cars
Roadsters